The Albany Wildlife Area(AWA) is a  tract of protected land located in Green County, Wisconsin, managed by the Wisconsin Department of Natural Resources (WDNR). Lands to be included in the wildlife area were first purchased in 1945 with the intention of them being used for inclusion in a new public area dedicated to hunting opportunities and conservation of indigenous species. That wildlife area was activated in 1956 as a Federal Aid Fish and Wildlife Restoration Project.

Land cover
The rest of the land grouped into the wildlife area is made up of leased land or other protected areas.

Flora and fauna
The wildlife area is a diverse environment, although for the most part tree cover consists of white oak, red oak, and American elm.  Invasive species found in the area include garlic mustard, buckthorn, crown vetch, autumn olive and wild parsnip.

References

External links
 U.S. Geological Survey Map at the U.S. Geological Survey Map Website. Retrieved August 22, 2022.
 Surface Water Data Viewer Map at the WNDR Website. Retrieved April 22, 2022.

State Wildlife Areas of Wisconsin
Protected areas of Wisconsin
Geography of Burnett County, Wisconsin
Protected areas established in 1956